Frank Andrew Walsh (December 23, 1902 – April 7, 1992) was an American professional golfer, who reached the final of the 1932 PGA Championship before losing to Olin Dutra.

Walsh was born in Chicago, Illinois. A number of his brothers were professional golfers including his elder brother, Tom, who was president of the PGA of America in 1940 and 1941.

Tournament wins
this list may be incomplete
1928 Wisconsin State Open
1935 Illinois PGA Championship
1938 New Hampshire Open
1940 New Jersey PGA Championship
1941 New Jersey PGA Championship

References

American male golfers
PGA Tour golfers
Golfers from Chicago
1902 births
1992 deaths